In Hinduism, Manda or Dhamini is the second consort of Shani and mother of Gulikan. She is a Gandharva princess and the most famous chief consort of Shani. She is the goddess of Kalā. Her Nrtya (Dance) can attract anyone in the whole Brahmānda (Universe). Manda is mentioned as divine regent of Planet Saturn (Shani) in India.

Legends
Manda's mother Divyanka died when Manda was little. Divyanka sacrificed her life fighting an Asura serpent trying to save baby Manda. Chitraratha mourned her death. Chitraratha, Manda's father, named her after the snake Dhamina as Dhamini since he wanted to keep that memory alive.

As per an ancient story, since his childhood Lord Shani was a keen devotee of Lord Shiva. Lord Surya married him to Dhamini.  One day Manda got depressed and cursed her husband, “You may not be able to look at some one in future, and your sight would remain ever downward. Whomsoever you look at, would be ruined away." When she overcame of her rage, she repented a lot, but the curse could not be get undone, so the sight of Lord Shani remains downward forever. But, when Lord Shani accepted his rank (Lord of deeds), he gets liberate from this curse.

Chanting names of consorts of Shani

In the chants, Dhamini is the leading consort of Lord Shani. Chanting names of consorts of Lord Shani also helps to appease Lord Shani.

Chants are-
‘Dhwajini Dhamini Chaiva Kankali Kalahpriya Kantaki Kalahi Chaatha Turangi Mahishi Aja Shanenarmaani Patninametani Sanjapana Puman Dukhani Nashayennityang Saubhagyamedhate Sukham’.

Also See 

 Manda d-Hayyi-Mandaean saviour uthra
 Neela (goddess)
 Shani
 Saraswati

Temples of son of Manda in Kerala, India

Temple of son of Goddess Manda in known as Gulikan Temple. Lord Shiva is worshipped there. There are some popular Gulikan Temples in Kerala, India:

Pullur Gulikan Temple -- SH 57, Pullur, Kerala 671531, India

Kaarilikkandiyil Gulikan Temple -- Ponniam, Kerala 670641, India

Sree Thirunelly Gulikan Kavu -- Wayanad, Kerala 673592, India

 Kunhichadukkam Gulikan Temple -- Kasaragod, Kerala 671314, India

 Sree Gulikan Devasthanam -- Peralam, Kerala 670521, India

 Naithallur Thalachilllon Gulikan Kshethram -- Anavathil-Manad Road Near Choorakattu Ayyappa Temple Manad, Ulliyeri, Kerala 673323, India

Also see: Gulikan Theyyam

In television 

Dhamini was shown in the show of  Karmaphal Daata Shani, which aired on Colours TV. Her character was played by Tina Dutta.

References

Hindu goddesses